The Citizens Publishing Company Building is a historic building in Culver City, California, U.S.. It was built in 1929. It has been listed on the National Register of Historic Places since February 12, 1987.

References

Houses on the National Register of Historic Places in California
Beaux-Arts architecture in California
Art Deco architecture in California
Houses completed in 1929
Houses in Los Angeles County, California
Buildings and structures in Culver City, California